Albert J. ("Mickey") Stunkard (February 7, 1922 – July 12, 2014) was an American psychiatrist. He is known for his first descriptions of binge eating disorder and night eating syndrome in the 1950s.

Life 
Albert Stunkard was born in  Manhattan, New York City, as the son of biologist Horace Stunkard. He studied medicine at Yale University and received his bachelor's degree in 1943. He received his MD from Columbia University in 1945. During World War II, he served as a physician in the United States Army in Japan. He was a lifelong student of D. T. Suzuki.

From 1973 to 1977 he was the head of the psychiatric department at Stanford University. Yet, he spent the majority of his career as a psychiatrist and researcher at the University of Pennsylvania.

Death 
He died on July 12, 2014 in his Bryn Mawr, Pennsylvania, home from pneumonia. He is generally considered as one of the most famous pioneers in obesity research. His work in 1959 is regarded as the beginning of pessimism about long-term weight management.

There is a chair professorship at the Perelman School of Medicine at the University of Pennsylvania named for Stunkard. Holders of the chair have included Thomas A. Wadden.

Selected publications 
 Albert J. Stunkard, Andrew Baum (Eds.): Perspectives in Behavioral Medicine – Eating, Sleeping, and Sex. 1st edition. Psychology Press, Hove, UK 1989, 
 Thomas A. Wadden, Albert J. Stunkard (Eds.): Obesity: Theory and Therapy. 2nd edition. Raven Press, New York 1993, .
 Kelly C. Allison, Albert J. Stunkard, Sara L. Thier: Overcoming Night Eating Syndrome. New Harbinger Publications, Oakland 2004, 
 Thomas A. Wadden, Albert J. Stunkard (Eds.): Handbook of Obesity Treatment. 1st edition. The Guilford Press, New York 2004, 
 Jennifer D. Lundgren, Kelly C. Allison, Albert J. Stunkard (Eds.): Night Eating Syndrome: Research, Assessment, and Treatment. 1st edition. The Guilford Press, New York 2012, .

References

External links 
 Festschrift about Albert Stunkard
 

1922 births
2014 deaths
American psychiatrists
Yale University alumni
Columbia University alumni
Deaths from pneumonia in Pennsylvania
Scientists from New York City
People from Manhattan
Stanford University faculty
University of Pennsylvania faculty
United States Army personnel of World War II
American expatriates in Japan